Vančura (feminine Vančurová) is an old aristocratic Czech surname. Notable people include:

 Antonín Vančura (1882–1939), real name of Czech writer Jiří Mahen
 Dušan Vančura (1969–2020), Czech singer
 Johanna Vancura (1915–unknown), Austrian sprinter
 Marta Vančurová (born 1948), Czech actress
 Tomáš Vančura (born 1996), Czech ski jumper
 Věra Vančurová (born 1932), Czech gymnast
 Vladislav Vančura (1891–1942), Czech writer

It may also refer to:
 The Vančura position in chess.

See also
 

Czech-language surnames